Taylor Symmank (born October 2, 1992) is an American football punter who is currently a free agent. He played college football at Texas Tech.

College career 
Symmank attended Southern Arkansas University in 2012 before transfer to Texas Tech University from 2013-2015. After a college career, he counts 99 punts at Texas Tech for 4,325 yards & 45 punts at Southern Arkansas for 1,797 yards.

Professional career

Minnesota Vikings
On January 3, 2017, Symmank signed with the Minnesota Vikings. He was waived on September 2, 2017.

New York Giants
After participating in The Spring League earlier in 2018, Symmank signed with the New York Giants on June 5. He was waived on July 25, 2018.

Arizona Hotshots
In 2018, Symmank signed with the Arizona Hotshots of the Alliance of American Football for the 2019 season, but did not make the final roster.

References

External links
Minnesota Vikings bio

1992 births
Living people
American football placekickers
Minnesota Vikings players
New York Giants players
People from McKinney, Texas
Southern Arkansas Muleriders football players
Texas Tech Red Raiders football players
Arizona Hotshots players